The Archcathedral Basilica of the Assumption of the Blessed Virgin Mary, usually called simply the Latin Cathedral is a 14th-century Roman Catholic cathedral in Lviv, western Ukraine. It is located in the city's Old Town, in the south western corner of the market square, called Cathedral Square.

History

The first church built on this site was a small wooden Roman Catholic church dedicated to the Holy Trinity, built in 1344 and lost in a fire six years later. In 1360, king Casimir III of Poland began the construction of the present day church, built in Gothic style, as the cathedral of the newly created Latin diocese. The church was consecrated in 1405 and the parish was moved here from "Our Lady of the Snows" church. In 1412 the see was transferred from Halych. Construction work continued throughout the 15th century and the cathedral was finally consecrated in 1481.

The cathedral witnessed many significant events. In 1440 the Metropolitan of Kiev, Cardinal Isidore celebrated Holy Mass for the intention of Christian Unity, when he stopped off in Lwów on his way back from the Council of Florence. It was visited by several Polish kings, most notably by John II Casimir, who entrusted the Polish–Lithuanian Commonwealth to the care of the Blessed Virgin in what came to known as the Lwów Oath.

In the years 1761–1776 the cathedral was refurbished in Baroque style and a tall bell tower was added. In 1776 the miraculous icon of the Mother of God held in the cathedral was crowned and placed in the main altar. In 1892–1898 the presbytery was remodelled in Neogothic style and stained glass, designed by Józef Mehoffer and Jan Matejko were installed. In 1910 the cathedral was granted the status of a minor basilica by Pope Pius X.

Following the Soviet annexation of almost half of Poland's pre-war territory the Latin Cathedral is presently one of just two churches in Lviv which were not closed down or made subject to the Muscovite Patriarchate during Soviet rule, the other being the Roman Catholic church of St. Anthony in Lychakiv, while the deported bishops of the See of Lwów resided in Lubaczów, a town in present-day southeastern Poland, close to the border with what is now Ukraine. In 1991 Pope John Paul II reactivated the Lviv diocese.

Meanwhile, the miraculous icon of the Madonna was moved to Kraków after World War II, and then in 1974 to the procathedral in Lubaczów. In 1983 it was once again crowned in Jasna Góra and remains presently in Lubaczów. Lviv Cathedral owns a copy which was crowned by Pope John Paul II during his Apostolic Visit to Ukraine on June 26, 2001.

See also
 Roman Catholic Church in Ukraine

External links
 Churches and chapels of the Roman Catholic Church in Ukraine 
 prysjan.ucoz.ua/lviv/

Cathedrals in Lviv
Gothic architecture in Ukraine
Basilica churches in Europe
Roman Catholic cathedrals in Ukraine
Wiśniowiecki family